Koroleva nochi (Cyrillic: Королева ночи) is the first EP by Ukrainian singer Olya Polyakova. It was released on 1 February 2019 through Best Music. The album includes the singles "Byvshy", "Koroleva nochi", "Lyubovnitsa", "Lyod tronulsya" and "Zvonila".

Track listing

Accolades 

|-
! scope="row"| 2018
| Music Platform Award
| Best Song
| "Koroleva nochi"
| 
| align="center"| 
|-
! scope="row" rowspan="3"| 2019
| rowspan="2"| YUNA Music Award
| Best Female Artist
| Olya Polyakova
| 
| align="center" rowspan="2"| 
|-
| Best Concert Tour
| Koroleva nochi Tour
| 
|-
| Music Platform Award
| Best Song
| "Led tronulsya"
| 
| align="center"| 
|-
! scope="row" rowspan="2"| 2020
| rowspan="2"| YUNA Music Award
| Best Pop Hit
| "Lyubovnitsa"
| 
| align="center" rowspan="2"| 
|-
| Best Concert Tour
| Koroleva nochi. Na bis Tour
| 
|}

Release history

References 

Olya Polyakova albums
2019 albums
Russian-language albums